The 2022–23 Northwestern Wildcats women's basketball represents Northwestern University in the 2022–23 college basketball season. Led by fiftheenth year head coach Joe McKeown, the team plays their games at the Welsh–Ryan Arena and are members of the Big Ten Conference.

Schedule and results

|-
!colspan=12 style=|Exhibition

|-
!colspan=12 style=|Regular season

See also
 2022–23 Northwestern Wildcats men's basketball team

References

Northwestern Wildcats women's basketball seasons
Northwestern Wildcats
Northwestern Wildcats women's basketball
Northwestern Wildcats women's basketball